Battle 1917 is a 1983 video game published by Cases Computer Simulations Ltd.

Gameplay
Battle 1917 is a game in which players oppose each other using armies, and must kill the other player's king to win.

Reception
Russell Clarke reviewed Battle 1917 for White Dwarf #54, and stated that "Perhaps because every victory is viewed equally with no opportunity for personal betterment. Its claim to be the machine age's answer to Chess can safely be ignored. Good value though!"

Review
Crash (Mar, 1984)

References

External links
Review in Crash
Review in Crash
Review in Home Computing Weekly
Review in Popular Computing Weekly

1983 video games
BBC Micro and Acorn Electron games
Computer wargames
Turn-based strategy video games
Video games developed in the United Kingdom
World War I video games
ZX Spectrum games